The Georgia Newspaper Hall of Fame recognizes newspaper editors and publishers of the U.S. state of Georgia for their significant achievements or contributions. A permanent exhibit of the honorees is maintained at the Henry W. Grady College of Journalism and Mass Communication in Athens, Georgia. The Hall of Fame was founded in 1931 and the first inductee was the school's namesake Henry W. Grady, honored with a bust created by artist Steffen Thomas. Additional honorees have been added periodically at the annual convention of the Georgia Press Association, which solicits nominations for the honor. Nominees must "have rendered outstanding services in the field of newspaper journalism" and can only be nominated three years after they have died.

Inductees

References

External links
 Georgia Press Association has the induction ceremony at their state convention

Journalists from Georgia (U.S. state)
State halls of fame in the United States
Lists of people from Georgia (U.S. state)
Halls of fame in Georgia (U.S. state)
Awards established in 1931
1931 establishments in Georgia (U.S. state)